The Route du Rhum is a single person transatlantic race the 2010 race was the 9th edition and had six classes with 91 boats taking part.

Results

Multihull - Ultime (Maxi)

Multihull - Multi 50

Monohulls - IMOCA 60

Monohulls - Class 40

Rhum

External Links
 
 Official You Tube Channel

Reference

Route du Rhum
2010 in sailing
Route du Rhum
Single-handed sailing competitions
Class40 competitions
IMOCA 60 competitions